Jack Perraton (26 February 1909 – 1 October 1950) was an Australian cricketer. He played four first-class cricket matches for Victoria between 1929 and 1931.

See also
 List of Victoria first-class cricketers

References

External links
 

1909 births
1950 deaths
Australian cricketers
Victoria cricketers
Cricketers from Melbourne